Keren Yarhi-Milo is a political scientist specializing in the study of interstate communication, crisis bargaining, reputation and credibility, and the psychology of leaders and decision makers. She is the dean of the School of International and Public Affairs, Columbia University and the Adlai E. Stevenson Professor of International Relations at Columbia University. She is also a former director of the Arnold A. Saltzman Institute of War and Peace Studies at Columbia.

Biography 

Keren Yarhi-Milo is the dean of Columbia University’s School of International and Public Affairs. An expert in international security, crisis decision making, and political psychology, Dean Yarhi-Milo is also an award-winning scholar with an extensive record of leadership and service at SIPA and Columbia, where she holds a professorship of political science and public and international affairs.

As a scholar and teacher, Yarhi-Milo bridges the academic and policy worlds, focusing predominantly on how leaders make foreign-policy decisions regarding the use of force. Her work draws on cutting-edge insights from psychology, organizational theory, and behavioral economics to explore the complicated contexts that surround decision making, signaling, and perception in international relations. Yarhi-Milo’s research also delves into the complexities of intelligence, the role of secrecy and deception in foreign policy, and the use of face-to-face diplomacy. All of her scholarship is grounded in an ongoing dialogue with policymakers, in which ideas and approaches are challenged and refined. She is known for coining selective attention theory and was a student of Robert Jervis, who became a deep personal mentor to her.

In 2022, Yarhi-Milo won the International Studies Association's Emerging Scholar Award, which recognizes “scholars who have made through their body of publications the most significant contribution to the field of security studies.”  Her most recent book, Who Fights for Reputation: The Psychology of Leaders in International Conflict (Princeton, 2018) was recognized by the American Political Science Association as best book in foreign policy and by the ISA as the biennial outstanding book in foreign policy.  Her previous book, Knowing the Adversary: Leaders, Intelligence, and Assessment of Intentions in International Relations (Princeton, 2014), received the Mershon Center for International Security’s Furnnis Award, given annually to an author whose first book makes an exceptional contribution to the study of national and international security, and was also cowinner of the ISA’s biennial book award in diplomatic studies.  

Yarhi-Milo is a series editor of Princeton Studies in International History and Politics from Princeton University Press. She has also published extensively in academic journals, receiving honors from the American Political Science Association, the International Studies Association, and the Journal of Conflict Resolution. In 2010, her doctoral dissertation earned APSA’s Kenneth Waltz Award as best in the field of international security and arms control.

Yarhi-Milo joined the Columbia faculty in 2019 after a decade at Princeton University. Before becoming dean in July 2022, Yarhi-Milo served for two years as director of SIPA’s Arnold A. Saltzman Institute of War and Peace Studies and as Arnold A. Saltzman Professor of War and Peace Studies.  She earned her PhD at the University of Pennsylvania and a BA, summa cum laude, from Columbia University in 2003.  She previously worked with several NGOs promoting peace in the Middle East, including the Peres Center for Peace and Innovation. 

Yarhi-Milo grew up in Israel, where she served as an intelligence officer while completing mandatory military service. She lives on the Upper West Side in Manhattan, NY with her husband and two sons.

References 

American people of Israeli descent
Princeton University faculty
Columbia University faculty
Columbia University School of General Studies alumni
University of Pennsylvania School of Arts and Sciences alumni
Israeli emigrants to the United States

Living people
Year of birth missing (living people)